Lu Yen-hsun was the defending champion but chose not to defend his title.

Alexei Popyrin won the title after defeating James Ward 3–6, 6–1, 7–5 in the final.

Seeds

Draw

Finals

Top half

Bottom half

References
Main Draw
Qualifying Draw

Jinan International Open - Men's Singles
2018 Men's Singles